The 1922–23 WPI Engineers men's basketball team represented Worcester Polytechnic Institute during the 1922–23 NCAA men's basketball season. They were coached by Ivan Bigler. The Engineers played their home games at Alumni Gym in Worcester, Massachusetts. The team finished the season with 6 wins and 8 losses.

References

WPI Engineers men's basketball seasons